The Acrobatidae are a small family of gliding marsupials containing two genera, each with a single species, the feathertail glider (Acrobates pygmaeus) from Australia and feather-tailed possum (Distoechurus pennatus) from New Guinea.

This family of the order Diprotodontia, which can be found in the east coast and inland of Australia and in some islands of New Guinea, is characterized by their very small size, which has side effects: because their mass-to-surface-area ratio is so small, heat escapes quicker from their bodies than it would in larger animals (the larger the mass-to-surface-area ratio, the harder it is to get rid of heat). Therefore, when temperature drops or food is scarce, they have trouble maintaining their body temperature and they enter a state known as torpidity (not to be confused with hibernation, which is not known in marsupials) which can last between one day and two weeks. In this state, the animal's breathing slows down, its temperature drops to almost that of its surroundings, and the animal becomes unresponsive.

Taxonomy
 Family Acrobatidae
 Genus Acrobates
 Feathertail glider, Acrobates pygmaeus
 Genus Distoechurus
 Feather-tailed possum, Distoechurus pennatus

References

Possums
Mammal families